Hojatoleslam Seyyed Mohammad-Hassan Aboutorabi Fard (born January 30, 1953) is an Iranian conservative politician and the former first deputy speaker of the Parliament of Iran. He was representative from Qazvin since 2004 to 2012 and from Tehran in 2012 until 2016 term.

References

External links

1953 births
Living people
People from Qom
People from Qazvin
First Deputies of Islamic Consultative Assembly
Second Deputies of Islamic Consultative Assembly
Combatant Clergy Association politicians
Members of the 9th Islamic Consultative Assembly
Members of the 8th Islamic Consultative Assembly
Members of the 7th Islamic Consultative Assembly
Deputies of Tehran, Rey, Shemiranat and Eslamshahr
Followers of Wilayat fraction members
Popular Front of Islamic Revolution Forces politicians
Iranian ayatollahs